The following lists events that happened during 2016 in Nigeria.

Incumbents

Federal government
 President: Muhammadu Buhari (APC)
 Vice President: Yemi Osinbajo (APC)
 Senate President: Bukola Saraki (APC)
 House Speaker: Yakubu Dogara (APC)
 Chief Justice: Mahmud Mohammed (Until 10 November)

Governors
 Abia State: Okezie Ikpeazu (PDP) 
 Adamawa State: Bindo Jibrilla (APC) 
 Akwa Ibom State: Udom Emmanuel (PDP) 
 Anambra State: Willie Obiano (APGA)
 Bauchi State: M. A. Abubakar (APC)
 Bayelsa State: Henry Dickson (PDP)
 Benue State: Samuel Ortom (APC)
 Borno State: Kashim Shettima (APC)
 Cross River State: Ben Ayade (PDP) 
 Delta State: Ifeanyi Okowa (PDP) 
 Ebonyi State: Dave Umahi (PDP)
 Edo State: Adams A. Oshiomhole (APC) (until 12 November); Godwin Obaseki (PDP) (starting 12 November)
 Ekiti State: Ayo Fayose (PDP)
 Enugu State: Ifeanyi Ugwuanyi (PDP) 
 Gombe State: Ibrahim Dankwambo (PDP)
 Imo State: Rochas Okorocha (APC)
 Jigawa State: Badaru Abubakar (APC)
 Kaduna State: Nasir el-Rufai (APC) 
 Kano State: Umar Ganduje (APC) 
 Katsina State: Aminu Masari (APC) 
 Kebbi State: Abubakar Atiku Bagudu (APC)
 Kogi State: Idris Wada (PDP) (until 27 January); Yahaya Bello (APC) (starting 27 January)
 Kwara State: Abdulfatah Ahmed (APC)
 Lagos State: Akinwumi Ambode (APC) 
 Nasarawa State: Umaru Al-Makura (APC)
 Niger State: Abubakar Sani Bello (APC) 
 Ogun State: Ibikunle Amosun (APC)
 Ondo State: Olusegun Mimiko (LP)
 Osun State: Rauf Aregbesola (APC)
 Oyo State: Abiola Ajimobi (APC)
 Plateau State: Simon Lalong (APC) 
 Rivers State: Ezenwo Nyesom Wike (PDP)
 Sokoto State: Aminu Tambuwal (APC) 
 Taraba State: Darius Ishaku (PDP) 
 Yobe State: Ibrahim Geida (APC)
 Zamfara State: Abdul-aziz Yari Abubakar (APC)

Events

January
 4 January - Haliru Mohammed Bello, the former Defense Minister and campaign manager for former President Goodluck Jonathan, was arrested on suspicion of money laundering.
 12 January - Boko Haram militants shot and killed 7 people and burned down 10 houses in Madagali, Adamawa

June
 11 June - 12th Africa Movie Academy Awards took place in Port Harcourt.

October
 29 October - Suspected Boko Haram suicide bombers kill at least nine people in Maiduguri.

See also
List of Nigerian films of 2016

References

 
2010s in Nigeria
Nigeria
Nigeria
Years of the 21st century in Nigeria